Marija Branković or Maria Branković may refer to:

 Marija Branković, Queen of Bosnia, daughter of despot Lazar Branković of Serbia
 Marija Branković, Marchioness of Montferrat, daughter of despot Stefan Branković of Serbia
 Marija Branković, Countess Frankopan, daughter of despot Jovan Branković of Serbia

See also
 Marija (disambiguation)
 Branković dynasty